Jenna Shoemaker (born 20 April 1984 in Concord, Massachusetts) is an actor, writer, former professional US triathlete and former member of the USA National Team. In 2009, she legally changed her name to Jenna Parker.

In 2010 Parker was number 49 in the World Championship Series ranking and number 5 in the USAT ranking. In 2012, she competed at the USA Triathlon Olympic Trials in San Diego, California.

In 2010, she was featured in the October Issue, XX Factor, of Outside Magazine and on NBC's Last Call with Carson Daly.

Parker holds a psychology degree from Harvard University. Her brother Jarrod Shoemaker is a professional triathlete, 2009 Duathlon World Champion and 2008 US Olympian.

In 2013, Parker retired from professional racing after winning the New York City Triathlon and finishing third at the Beijing International Triathlon.

She was coached by Brett Sutton from January to June of the 2013 season, and by Darren Smith from September 2008 until April 2010. She also had a short residency from the fall of 2010 to early 2011 working with Terrence Mahon and the Mammoth Track Club.

In 2015, Parker was a member of the Harvey Cedars Beach Patrol team that finished 2nd at the 1st annual Red Bull Surf and Rescue event held in Atlantic City, NJ. Parker was featured in the mini-documentary around the event. She is also the only woman to win the Cape May Women's Point Challenge event three times (2014, 2016 & 2017) and the only woman to win the LBIBPA "Ironwoman" event (2016, 2017) - a row, run, swim, prone paddle - which was introduced to competition in 2016.

Parker currently splits time between Atlanta, Georgia, NYC and Los Angeles, California where she is cultivating a career as an actor and writer. In the summer of 2016, she played the lead character "Tracy" in the SyFy feature film, produced by The Asylum, titled Ice Sharks. She has hosted both the IMG Escape from Alcatraz and Beijing International Triathlon events (airing on CBS Sports Network in the US).

ITU Competitions 
In the seven years from 2004 to 2010, Shoemaker took part in 48 ITU competitions and achieved 13 top ten positions.

The following list is based upon the official ITU rankings and the athlete's Profile Page. Unless indicated otherwise, the competitions are triathlons (Olympic distance) and belong to the Elite category.

BG = the sponsor British Gas
DNS = did not start
DNF = did not finish

References

External links 
 TheJennaParker.com
 
 US Triathlon Federation: Shoemaker's profile page

American female triathletes
1984 births
Harvard University alumni
Living people
People from Concord, Massachusetts
21st-century American actresses
American film actresses
Sportspeople from Middlesex County, Massachusetts